The 2012–13 Eastern Kentucky Colonels basketball team represented Eastern Kentucky University during the 2012–13 NCAA Division I men's basketball season. The Colonels, led by eighth year head coach Jeff Neubauer, played their home games at McBrayer Arena within Alumni Coliseum and were members of the East Division of the Ohio Valley Conference. They finished the season 25–10, 12–4 in OVC play to finish in second place in the East Division. They advanced to the semifinals of the OVC tournament where they lost to Murray State. They were invited to the 2013 CIT where they defeated Gardner–Webb in the first round before falling in the second round to Evansville.

Roster

Schedule

|-
!colspan=9| Regular season

|-
!colspan=9| 2013 OVC Basketball tournament

|-
!colspan=9| 2013 CIT

References

Eastern Kentucky Colonels men's basketball seasons
Eastern Kentucky
Eastern Kentucky